Casanova is a Catalan and Italian surname, which translates literally as "New House". Notable people with the surname include:

Achille Casanova (1941-2016), Swiss journalist and politician
Alain Casanova (born 1961), French football player and manager
Briley Casanova, American gymnast
Bruno Casanova (born 1964), Italian Grand Prix motorcycle road racer.
Bruno Óscar Casanova (born 1984), Argentine football player.
Cessy Casanova (born circa 1969), Mexican comedian and singer.
Claudio Casanova (1895-1916), Italian football player
Coral Del Mar Casanova, Puerto Rican beauty pageant
Corina Casanova (born 1956), chancellor of Switzerland
Danielle Casanova (1909-1943), French militant communist and member of the French resistance, first wife of Laurent Casanova
Dino Casanova (1967-2002), American wrestler
Emilia Casanova de Villaverde (1832-1897), Cuban political activist
Félix Casanova de Ayala (1915–1990), Spanish poet.
Fernando Casanova (born 1988), Dominican football player
Francesco Giuseppe Casanova (1727–1803), Italian painter, brother of Giacomo Casanova
Giacomo Casanova (1725–1798), Italian adventurer and writer
Giovanni Battista Casanova (1730–1795), Italian painter, brother of Giacomo Casanova
Hernando Casanova (1945–2002), Colombian television actor.
Jaime de Casanova (died 1504), Spanish Catholic cardinal
Jean-Claude Casanova, chairman of the Fondation Nationale des Sciences Politiques
Julián Casanova (disambiguation), several people
Jorge Daniel Casanova (born 1976), Uruguayan football player
Jorge Francisco Casanova (born 1984), Venezuelan football player
José Casanova, US sociologist 
José Casanova Mendoza (1964–1987), Peruvian football player
José Antonio Casanova (1918–1999), Venezuelan baseball player and manager
Kenny Casanova (born 1971), American wrestler and manager
Laurent Casanova (1906-1972), French politician
Len Casanova (1905–2002), U.S. college football coach, member of the College Football Hall of Fame
Lourdes Casanova, Spanish academic and author
Luis Casanova (born 1992), Chilean football player
Manuel Casanova, American medical professor
Michael Casanova (born 1989), Swiss football player
Myriam Casanova (born 1985), Swiss tennis player
Nacho Casanova (born 1987), Spanish football player
Paul Casanova (born 1941), Cuban baseball player
Rafael Casanova (1660–1743), Conseller en Cap of the Consell de Cent of Barcelona during the siege of the city by the troops of Philip V of Spain
Raul Casanova (born 1972), Puerto Rican baseball player
Rodolfo Casanova (born 1915), Mexican boxer
Sara Casanova (born 1977), Italian politician
Sofía Casanova (1861–1958), Spanish journalist and writer
Tommy Casanova (born 1950), U.S. football player, member of the College Football Hall of Fame, former Louisiana state senator
Tristano Casanova (born 1983), German actor
Vicente Casanova y Marzol (1854–1930), Spanish Catholic cardinal

Italian-language surnames